Orvilleus is a monotypic genus of Panamanian jumping spiders containing the single species, Orvilleus crassus. It was first described by Arthur Merton Chickering in 1946, and is only found in Panama.

References

External links
 Diagnostic Drawings

Fauna of Panama
Monotypic Salticidae genera
Salticidae
Spiders of Central America